John Muhanguzi is an Anglican bishop in Uganda: he was the  Bishop of North Ankole from 2003 to 2015.

References

Anglican bishops of North Ankole
21st-century Anglican bishops in Uganda
Living people
Year of birth missing (living people)